Neophrida aurolimbalis is a species of snout moth in the genus Neophrida. It was described by Heinrich Benno Möschler in 1882 and is known from Suriname.

References

Moths described in 1882
Tirathabini